NTPC Jhanor-Gandhar is a gas-based power plant run by National Thermal Power Corporation (NTPC), located at Urja Nagar, in Bharuch district in the Indian state of Gujarat. Gujarat state The power plant its gas from the Gandhar Gas field, and water from the Narmada river. The site is about 18 km north-east of Bharuch City.The plant is a base load, combined cycle power plant. The waste heat from the outlet gases of gas turbine is used to heat water in waste heat recovery boiler (WHRB) of Kawasaki make and subsequently run the steam turbine. The gas turbine capacity is increased to 144.3 MW by injecting de-mineralised water into the combustion chamber. The plant capacity is 657.39 MW (144.3*3+224.49) MW. The plant receives natural gas from Gujarat State Petronet Corporation Ltd (GSPC) and Gas Authority of India Ltd. (GAIL). The power transmission is at 220 kV and 400 kV.

Capacity

References 

Natural gas-fired power stations in Gujarat
Bharuch district
1994 establishments in Gujarat
Energy infrastructure completed in 1994